The president of the Chamber of Representatives of Colombia commonly known as the president of the Chamber is the highest authority of the Chamber of Representatives of Colombia. The office was established in 1811 by the First National Congress of Colombia.

It is third on the presidential line of succession after the vice president and the president of the senate.

The office is currently held by David Racero of the Humane Colombia Party He was elected on 13 March 2022, will be succeeded by Olga Lucía Velásquez Olga's term as President of the Chamber of Representatives will then expire on 20 July 2023, after which the remaining four presidencies will be shared between the opposition members Likewise, the first and second vice-presidencies were assigned to people who are members of the
Democratic Center.

See also
 Congress of Colombia
 President of the Senate of Colombia

References

Colombia, Chamber of Representatives
Politics of Colombia